The following is a family tree of gods and goddesses from Babylonian mythology.

See also
Enūma Eliš
List of Mesopotamian deities

References

Notes

Citations

Sources

Further reading 

 
 

Babylonian gods

